Kadiivka or Stakhanov is a city in Luhansk Oblast in eastern Ukraine, Donbas. The city is incorporated as a city of oblast significance. The city has been under the control of the self-declared Luhansk People's Republic since early 2014. Following the 2022 annexation referendums in Russian-occupied Ukraine, Russia has claimed the city as theirs.

Name
 Kadiivka
 Stakhanov
Prior to 1937 the city was known as Kadiivka. From 1937 to 1940, the city was named Sergo or Serho after Bolshevik leader Sergo Ordzhonikidze, and then from 1940 to 1978, the city was once again known as Kadiivka.

On 15 February 1978, the city was renamed Stakhanov after the Soviet miner Alexey Stakhanov, who started his career there.

On May 12, 2016, Ukraine's Verkhovna Rada within the process of decommunization changed its legal name back to the historic Kadiivka, As the LNR / Russian occupation government have not recognized this decision and maintain the Soviet name, the name change has had a largely symbolic meaning.

History
A local newspaper has been published in the settlement since September 1930. Kadiivka has been a city since 1932.

During the Second World War, the city was occupied by German troops from July 1942 until September 1943. A Soviet labor camp for German prisoners of war operated at Kadiivka during the Second World War.

In 1985, in the Soviet Union, the city was awarded the Order of the Red Banner of Labour.

The largest industrial enterprises of the city were traditionally coal mines, a railway car building works, ferroalloy plant and a coke-chemical plant.

In 1991, the population was 112,700 people, by 2013 this had fallen to 77,593.

Pro-Russian separatist occupation (2014-present) 
The city has been under the control of the Luhansk People's Republic since early 2014, and the War in Donbas. Starting mid-April 2014 pro-Russian separatists captured several towns in Donetsk Oblast; they took over Kadiivka on 2 May 2014.

In October 2015, the OSCE Special Monitoring Mission to Ukraine opened a Forward Patrol Base in the city, meaning that a small number of international monitors were due to be permanently based here. The OSCE left the city shortly before the 2022 Russian invasion of Ukraine began.

With Russia's Wagner Group having significant bases in Kadiivka, Ukrainian forces have reportedly scored repeated hits on them, with multiple casualties.

Transport 
The city formerly had electric city transport in the form of both trams and trolleybuses. Tram traffic opened on February 15, 1937, and trolleybus traffic opened on March 1, 1970. Tram traffic closed on November 11, 2007, and trolleybus traffic closed on August 31, 2011, while it is elsewhere reported that it was suspended on September 11, 2008, with its newer LAZ trolleybuses bought by Antratsyt. As the years went on, the number of trams dwindled from 38 in 1973 to 4 in 2007, of which only 2 would run.

Demographics
As of the Ukrainian Census of 2001:

Ethnicity
 Ukrainians: 46.1%
 Russians: 50.1%
 Belarusians: 1%
 Other: 2.9%

Language
Russian: 85.3%
Ukrainian: 13.0%
Belarusian: 0.1%
Armenian: 0.1%

City municipality
The Municipality of Kadiivka also includes two other cities:
 Almazna
 Irmino

Notable people
Notable people that were born or lived in Kadiivka include:
Grisha Filipov (1919–1994), Bulgarian politician

References

 
Cities in Luhansk Oblast
Cities of regional significance in Ukraine
Populated places established in the Russian Empire
City name changes in Ukraine
Soviet toponymy in Ukraine